These are lists of spelling-to-sound correspondences in the Catalan language. The two main standard forms (Standard Catalan and Standard Valencian) are used as primary transcriptions norms of their respective spelling forms.

Spelling patterns and pronunciation in Catalan and Valencian

Notes

References

Bibliography

Alphabet, Catalan
Indo-European Latin-script orthographies